Wakefield is an unincorporated community in West Feliciana Parish, Louisiana, United States. Its elevation is 246 feet (75 m).

The United States Postal Service, along U.S. Highway 61, serves the community.

Education
West Feliciana Parish Public Schools serves the community. All residents are zoned to Bains Lower Elementary School, Bains Elementary School, West Feliciana Middle School, and West Feliciana High School.

Notable person
 Isaac D. Smith, United States Army major general

External links
West Feliciana Historical Society Museum
West Feliciana Tourist Commission

References

Unincorporated communities in West Feliciana Parish, Louisiana
Unincorporated communities in Louisiana